Alexander Klibanov may refer to:
Alexander Klibanov (biologist), professor of biology at the University of Virginia
Alexander Klibanov (chemist), professor of chemistry and bioengineering at the Massachusetts Institute of Technology